August Reinberg (16 March 1860 – 17 July 1908) was a Baltic German architect from Riga.

August Reinberg was born in Riga as the son of Jakob Reinberg and Luise, née Kastan. He studied architecture at the Riga Polytechnic Institute (today Riga Technical University) between 1877 and 1882. He worked as an assistant to Robert Pflug between 1881 and 1883 and conducted a study trip to Italy, France and Germany in the years 1884–1885. He was a teacher at the Riga Polytechnic Institute in 1885–1886 and assistant professor there from 1905. He worked as an architect in Saint Petersburg between 1890 and 1899; during this time he was granted the honour of "artist, 2nd grade" at the Imperial Academy of Arts. He then moved back and settled in Riga, where he lived the rest of his life. Reinberg was also the chairman of the Architects Union of Riga.

He designed several apartment buildings in Riga, as well as more prestigious commissions, such as banks in both Riga and Tallinn, a mental hospital in Strenči and the present-day Latvian National Theatre.

Works

References

Architects from Riga
Baltic-German people
1860 births
1908 deaths
Riga Technical University alumni